The Lehrerleut, also  Lehrerleit, are a branch of the Hutterites that emerged in 1877. They are the most traditional branch of the Hutterites.

History

Thirteen Hutterite families under the leadership of Jacob Wipf (1835–1896) emigrated from Johannesruh, Ukraine, to South Dakota in 1877. After their arrival, they formed the Lehrerleut by establishing a community of goods at Elmspring Colony near Parkston, South Dakota, thus following the example of the Schmiedeleut and the Dariusleut. The group's leader was a teacher (German: Lehrer), hence their name Lehrerleut ("teacher people").

Shortly after World War I, two Hutterite conscientious objectors from the Lehrerleut branch, Joseph and Michael Hofer, died in an American prison. This and growing anti-German sentiment caused the emigration of all four Lehrerleut colonies to Alberta, Canada, in the following years. In 1945, the Lehrerleut started to form new colonies in Montana, thus returning to the United States.

Demography

In 1957 there were 20 Lehrerleut colonies in Alberta, 3 in Saskatchewan and 8 in Montana. In 1973 the total number of Lehrerleut colonies was 61. According to the "2004 Hutterite Phone Book" there were 69 Schmiedeleut colonies in Alberta and 30 in Saskatchewan. An additional 44 colonies were in Montana, all together 143. Rod Janzen and Max Stanton report in their book of 2010 that there were 139 Lehrerleut colonies, 72 in Alberta, 32 Saskatchewan and 35 in Montana.

References

Further reading
John A. Hostetler: Hutterite Society, Baltimore, MD, 1974.
Rod Janzen and Max Stanton: The Hutterites in North America, Baltimore, MD, 2010.
John Lehr and Yosef Kats: Inside the Ark: The Hutterites in Canada and the United States, Regina 2012.

External links
hutterites.org, the website of the Hutterian Brethren (Schmiedeleut 1)

Hutterites
German diaspora
Anabaptist denominations
Anabaptism